Flávio José Araújo (born 30 January 1963), known as Flávio Araújo, is a Brazilian football coach, currently in charge of Nacional de Patos.

Honours
Fortaleza
 Campeonato Cearense: 2000
 Copa dos Campeões Cearenses: 2016

Icasa
 Campeonato Cearense Serie B: 2003, 2010

4 de Julho
 Campeonato Piauiense Serie B: 2003

 Parnahyba
 Campeonato Piauiense: 2004, 2005

Barras
 Campeonato Piauiense: 2008

 Flamengo-PI
 Copa Piauí: 2008

Sampaio Corrêa
 Campeonato Maranhense: 2012, 2014
 Campeonato Brasileiro Série D: 2012

River
 Campeonato Piauiense: 2015, 2019

CSA
 Campeonato Brasileiro Série C: 2017

References

1963 births
Living people
Sportspeople from Fortaleza
Brazilian football managers
Campeonato Brasileiro Série B managers
Campeonato Brasileiro Série C managers
Campeonato Brasileiro Série D managers
Fortaleza Esporte Clube managers
Ceará Sporting Club managers
Ferroviário Atlético Clube (CE) managers
Ríver Atlético Clube managers
Associação Desportiva Recreativa e Cultural Icasa managers
FC Atlético Cearense managers
Parnahyba Sport Club managers
Central Sport Club managers
Esporte Clube Flamengo managers
Sampaio Corrêa Futebol Clube managers
América Futebol Clube (RN) managers
Clube do Remo managers
Mogi Mirim Esporte Clube managers
Cuiabá Esporte Clube managers
Centro Sportivo Alagoano managers
Treze Futebol Clube managers
Campinense Clube managers